Essonne is a département of France in the southern Île-de-France region. It is named after the river Essonne. In 2019, it had a population of 1,301,659 across 194 communes.

Essonne was formed on 1 January 1968 when Seine-et-Oise was split into smaller départements. Its prefecture is Évry-Courcouronnes. Its INSEE and postcode number is 91.

History 
The Essonne département was created on 1 January 1968, from the southern portion of the former département of Seine-et-Oise.

In June 1963, Carrefour S.A. opened the first hypermarket in the Paris region at Sainte-Geneviève-des-Bois (although the word "hypermarché" was first used only in 1966).  Based on the ideas put forward by the American logistics pioneer Bernardo Trujillo, the centre offered on a single  site a hitherto unknown combination of wide choice and low prices, supported by 400 car parking spaces.

In 1969, the communes of Châteaufort and Toussus-le-Noble were separated from Essonne and added to the département of Yvelines.

Geography 
Essonne belongs to the region of Île-de-France.

It has borders with the départements of: 
Hauts-de-Seine and Val-de-Marne to the north,
Seine-et-Marne to the east,
Loiret to the south,
Eure-et-Loir and Yvelines to the west.

All of northern Essonne département belongs to the Parisian agglomeration and is very urbanized. The south remains rural.

Principal towns

The most populous commune is Évry-Courcouronnes, the prefecture. As of 2019, the 5 most populous communes are:

In descending order, the other communes over 25,000 population are: Athis-Mons, Palaiseau, Vigneux-sur-Seine, Viry-Châtillon, Ris-Orangis, Yerres, Draveil, Grigny, Brétigny-sur-Orge, Étampes, Brunoy and Les Ulis. Milly-la-Forêt is a notable example of its more rural communes.

Main sights
The École Polytechnique. Founded in 1794, L'Ecole Polytechnique is one of the most prestigious engineering universities in France. This university was ranked 10th in the world by the Times Higher Education Supplement in 2005. Its campus is in the town of Palaiseau.
Paris-Sud University. One of the best public schools in France, it is ranked 52nd by Academic Ranking of World Universities. It is best known for its mathematics department. Located in Orsay, Essonne, about 26,000 students are enrolled.
The Headquarters of the Arianespace Company, a major commercial aerospace launcher, servicing companies who wish to launch satellites into space.
Château de Montlhéry. Originally having been an ancient fort during Roman times, the first feudal lords began to inhabit the castle around 1000 AD. One major battle was fought in the castle during its lifetime. In 1465, Charles the Rash and French King Louis XI fought in the plains in front of the castle. In 1842, the reconstruction of the castle was started, and currently is being maintained by the local town of Montlhery
 Château de Courances
 The Forest of Sénart. Covering 3,500 hectares in area, this forest is very important to the local population. The local government has kept roads and agricultural companies from cutting down parts of this forest. The forest receives between two and three million visitors annually, and the government spends 1.2 million euros a year maintaining it.
 Telecom Sudparis. Situated in Évry, this is a grande école for engineers

Politics

The department's most high-profile political representative has been Manuel Valls, who was Prime Minister of France from 31 March 2014 to 6 December 2016. Valls visited its main town, Évry, to deliver remarks following the Charlie Hebdo massacre of January 2015. The president of the Departmental Council is François Durovray, elected in 2015.

Presidential election, second round

Members of the National Assembly

Demographics
Population development since 1876:

Place of birth of residents

Tourism

Sister regions
Essonne is twinned with:
  Ibaraki Prefecture, Japan (since 1986)

See also
Cantons of the Essonne department
Communes of the Essonne department
Arrondissements of the Essonne department

References

External links

  Prefecture website
  Departmental council website

 
1968 establishments in France
Departments of Île-de-France
States and territories established in 1968